The Federação Portuguesa de Cricket is the official governing body of the sport of cricket in Portugal. Its current headquarters is located in Codex, Portugal. The Federação Portuguesa de Cricket is Portugal's representative at the International Cricket Council and is an affiliate member and has been a member of that body since 1996. It is also a member of the European Cricket Council.

See also
Portuguese Cricket Federation

References

External links
Official site of the Federação Portuguesa de Cricket

Portugal